Chester Isham Reed (November 23, 1823 – September 2, 1873) was an American attorney who served in both branches of the Massachusetts legislature, as Attorney General of Massachusetts, and as an associate justice of the Massachusetts Superior Court.

Early life
Reed was born to William and Elizabeth Deane (Dennis) Reed on November 23, 1823 in Taunton, Massachusetts.

Education
Reed attended Taunton High School, Bristol Academy and Brown University.  Because of his father's adverse circumstances Reed was forced to leave Brown University.  Reed moved to Gardiner, Maine to study law.  After he completed his study of law, Reed moved back to Taunton

Newspaper employment
After he moved back to Taunton, Massachusetts Reed was, for about a year, editor of the Old Colony Republican newspaper.

Massachusetts Legislature
At the age of 26 Reed was elected to represent Taunton in the Massachusetts House of Representatives.  Reed was in the Massachusetts Senate in 1858 and 1862.   While in the Senate of 1862 Reed served on the Joint Standing Committees on Railways and Canals, and on the Subject of Apportioning the State into Congressional Districts.

Marriage and children
On February 24, 1851, Reed married Elizabeth Y. Allyn of New Bedford, Massachusetts.  The couple had two children, Sybil Reed, and Chester Allyn Reed.

Law career
In 1848 Reed entered into a law partnership with Anselm Bassett.  Reed practiced law in the firm of Bassett & Reed for the next 15 years.

Public Service Career
In 1864 Reed was elected as a Republican to the office of the Massachusetts Attorney General.  Reed serves as the Massachusetts Attorney General until 1867 when he was appointed as Associate Justice of the Massachusetts Superior Court.

Reed resigned from the Superior Court in 1870.

Death
Reed died on September 2, 1873 in White Sulphur Springs, West Virginia, where he had gone to improve his health.

References

1823 births
1873 deaths
Members of the Massachusetts House of Representatives
Massachusetts state senators
Massachusetts Attorneys General
People from Taunton, Massachusetts
19th-century American newspaper editors
19th-century American politicians